During this period, Hockey Night in Canada studio shows were still originate on-site. Ward Cornell hosted the Toronto Maple Leafs broadcasts until 1972 when Dave Hodge replaced him as the host. Jack Dennett, Howie Meeker, and Bob Goldham, who also serves as the color commentator, were the studio analysts. From 1971 to 1979, Brian McFarlane, Mike Anscombe, and Dave Reynolds hosted the telecast from the Montreal Forum. Starting in 1977, Dick Irvin Jr. hosted the telecast and The Fisher Report at the Montreal Forum with newspaper columnist Red Fisher, In the 1975, 1976, and 1979, Bill Good, Ted Reynolds, and Steve Armitage hosted the Vancouver Canucks games. Brian McFarlane presented the Peter Puck and Showdown with Howie Meeker. These intermission features provided emphasis for each regional telecast.

Stanley Cup playoffs

Notes
In , Hockey Night in Canada moved all playoff coverage from CBC to CTV to avoid conflict with the lengthy NABET strike against the CBC. Eventually, MacLaren Advertising, in conjunction with Molson Breweries and Imperial Oil/Esso, who actually owned the rights to Hockey Night in Canada (not CBC) decided to give the playoff telecast rights to CTV. Initially, it was on a game by game basis in the quarterfinals (Game 1 of the Boston-Toronto series was seen on CFTO Toronto in full while other CTV affiliates, but not all joined the game in progress. Game 1 of the New York Rangers-Montreal series was seen only on CFCF Montreal while Game 4 not televised due to a lockout of technicians at the Montreal Forum), and then the full semifinals and Stanley Cup Finals. Because CTV did not have 100% penetration in Canada at this time, they asked CBC (who ultimately refused) to allow whatever one of their affiliates were the sole network in that market to show the playoffs. As a result, the 1972 Stanley Cup playoffs were not seen in some of the smaller Canadian markets unless said markets were close enough to the United States border to pick up the signal of a CBS affiliate.
When Game 7 of the 1975 playoff series between Pittsburgh and the New York Islanders took place, Bill Hewitt's Toronto Maple Leafs were already eliminated, the team of Danny Gallivan and Dick Irvin Jr. were prepping for the Buffalo-Montreal series, and Brian McFarlane was assisting NBC for their Game 1 coverage of the aforementioned Montreal-Buffalo series the next day (April 26).
CBC announced prior to the preliminary round of the 1976 playoffs that they will not televise any games from the opening round. As a result of this, the rights were sold back to the individual Canadian teams. Since Montreal received a bye into the quarterfinals, this impacted Toronto and Vancouver's television coverage. While CHCH and CITY both televised all three games of the Toronto-Pittsburgh series (with Bill Hewitt and Brian McFarlane on the call), CHAN picked up the Vancouver-New York Islanders series.
Game 1 of the Philadelphia-Toronto series was televised locally to Southern Ontario by CHCH.
Game 1 of the 1977 Pittsburgh-Toronto playoff series was seen regionally in Southern Ontario on CHCH-Hamilton.
Starting in the 1978 playoffs, the NHL Network began simulcasting many games with Hockey Night in Canada.  In these games, Dan Kelly, who was the NHL Network's lead play-by-play announcer, was assigned to do play-by-play along with HNIC color commentators.  This for example, happened in Game 7 of the quarterfinal series between the Toronto Maple Leafs and New York Islanders (April 29), where Kelly teamed up with Brian McFarlane. The entire 1978 Stanley Cup Finals between the Montreal Canadiens and the Boston Bruins and the entire 1979 Stanley Cup Finals between the Montreal Canadiens and New York Rangers was simulcast as well.
In 1979, Jim Robson's contract with the Vancouver Canucks required him to call all road games on the radio. Meanwhile, he called Canucks home playoff games on CBC. This particular arrangement lasted until 1985, when Robson left CBC.

See also
List of Hockey Night in Canada commentators

References

External links
Stanley Cup Playoffs on CBC - Google Search
Hockey Night in Canada

CBC Sports
National Hockey League on television
Lists of National Hockey League broadcasters